The Aarhus Custom House (Toldkammeret) is located on the harbour front in Aarhus, Denmark. Completed in 1898, it is said to be Hack Kampmann's finest work. Kampmann also designed other buildings in the city including Marselisborg Palace and Aarhus Teater.

The building was used by the tax authorities until the mid-1990s. Tækker Group, who purchased the building in 2004, have fully renovated the building in collaboration with the cultural authorities, taking care to maintain the Kampmann style. After being used in recent years by the architecture school and as a student hostel, the building currently houses a restaurant.

References

Literature

External links 

De Bynære Havnearealer
Listed buildings in Aarhus
Tourist attractions in Aarhus
National Romantic architecture in Aarhus
Custom houses
Government buildings completed in 1898
Art Nouveau government buildings
Hack Kampmann buildings
Restaurants in Aarhus